Una is a city in Bahia, Brazil. Its population in 2020 was 18,544 inhabitants.

The municipality was founded on August 2, 1890. The GDP per capita is R$ 2,649 (IBGE / 2005).
Una-Comandatuba Airport serves both the city of Una and Transamérica Resort, located at nearby Comandatuba Island.

Environment

The municipality contains the  Una Biological Reserve, a strictly protected conservation unit created in 1980.
It contains most of the  Una Wildlife Refuge, which surrounds the biological reserve.
It also contains part of the  Serra das Lontras National Park, created in 2010.
The municipality contains part of the  Canavieiras Extractive Reserve, created in 2006.

References

Populated coastal places in Bahia
Municipalities in Bahia